Asthenotricha quadrata is a moth in the family Geometridae. It was described by Claude Herbulot in 1960. It is endemic to Madagascar.

References

Moths described in 1960
quadrata
Moths of Madagascar
Endemic fauna of Madagascar
Taxa named by Claude Herbulot